Alan Harper may refer to:

Alan Harper (American football) (born 1979), American football player
Alan Harper (bishop) (born 1944), Anglican Archbishop of Armagh
Alan Harper (footballer) (born 1960), English footballer
Alan Harper (politician) (born 1957), member of the Alabama House of Representatives
Alan Harper (Two and a Half Men), fictional character in the sitcom Two and a Half Men

See also
Allan Harper (born 1954), Australian rules footballer